Rhaphiptera melzeri is a species of beetle in the family Cerambycidae. It was described by S. A. Fragoso and Miguel A. Monné in 1984. It is known from Brazil.

References

melzeri
Beetles described in 1984